IIS University, officially IIS (Deemed to be University), is a private higher education institute deemed to be university, located in Jaipur, Rajasthan, India. Formerly International College for Girls (ICG), it was conferred the deemed university status in 2009.

References

External links

Educational institutions established in 2009
2009 establishments in Rajasthan
Universities and colleges in Jaipur
Universities in Rajasthan